Nishada flabrifera is a moth of the family Erebidae. It is found in Sri Lanka, India (Calcutta, Travancore, Nilgiris) and on Java.

Description
Its wingspan is about 30 mm. Male with the basal half of antennae not thickened. Forewings with vein 3 and 4 from cell. vein 6 from below angle and vein 10 absent. Hindwings with vein 6 absent. In male, head smoky black, and thorax yellowish brown. Abdomen ochreous, where the second segment is almost scaleless and shoring dark cuticle. Forewing uniformly yellowish brown. Hindwings are ochreous.

Ecology
The larvae have been recorded feeding on mosses growing on moist walls. They are black dorsally and light grey ventrally. The body is covered with black hairs. Pupation takes place in a loose cocoon.

References

External links
 

Lithosiina
Moths described in 1878